Madeline (Madeleine)  (November 15, 1900 – January 15, 1989) and her twin sister Marion Fairbanks (November 15, 1900 – September 20, 1973) were American stage and motion picture actresses active in the silent era. The two sisters were seemingly inseparable. However, their Thanhouser filmographies are slightly different, as on occasion one twin appeared in a film without the other.

Early life
Born in New York City, the twins were mainly educated by private tutors at home and while traveling. Their mother was actress Jennie M. Fairbanks, a.k.a. Jane Fairbanks, and their father was the son of Nathaniel Fairbanks, who served in the American Civil War, and a descendant of Jonathan Fairbanks, a Massachusetts hero of the Revolution. Madeline and Marion had an older brother, Robert.

Career

The twins began their career on the stage in such productions as Alias Jimmy Valentine, Mother, Salomy Jane, Mrs. Wiggs of the Cabbage Patch, and countless others. Starting in 1909 they performed with Nora Bayes in The Jolly Bachelors. Madeline wrote a note to President William Howard Taft, who received the twins at a private reception when they performed in Washington, D.C. After the meeting, he presented them with an autographed picture. At first Marion desired to be a dramatic actress while Madeline aspired to playing comedic roles.

They entered films with Biograph circa 1910. They joined the Thanhouser Film Corporation in 1912, where they were billed as "The Thanhouser Twins", and remained there until 1916. The Fairbanks sisters appeared with Teddie Gerard in the cast of the Florenz Ziegfeld Midnight Frolic in August 1920.

In 1923, Madeline decided to pursue dramatic roles, while Marion continued in musical revues, touring in the title role with the "Little Nellie Kelly company". Madeline landed roles in Mercenary Mary, The Grab Bag, and The Ritz Revue. By 1924, the girls had felt their separation too keenly, and they rejoined on stage in George White's Scandals, followed in early 1927 by parts in Oh, Kay.

Later years
By 1932, Marion was on stage separately at the Waldorf Theatre, New York City. She succeeded Eleanor King as leading lady in Whistling in the Dark. 1930s news accounts reported that she operated a beauty parlor and directed a branch of a cosmetics manufacturer. In her later years she knew much unhappiness and struggled with the temptations of alcohol.

Deaths
Marion Fairbanks died in Georgia in 1973 and was buried at Westview Cemetery. Her name was then Marion Fairbanks Delph. She had no survivors other than her sister. Madeline married Leonard Sherman in 1937. The union ended in divorce in 1947. She lived in New York until early 1989, where she died of respiratory failure.

Work

Stage

Film

References
 New York Times, Theatrical Notes, August 9, 1920, Page 6.
 Syracuse Herald, Juvenile Performers Are Stage Veterans, May 5, 1912, Page 48.

External links

 
 
 

Actresses from New York (state)
American child actresses
American film actresses
American silent film actresses
American stage actresses
American twins
Vaudeville performers
20th-century American actresses
Sibling duos